Luis Landa Escober (December 28, 1875 - 1977) was a Honduran academic, scientist and lawyer. 

Escober was known for his papers on nature, botany, chemistry and the natural sciences. A member of the Society of Geography and History of Honduras, he was given several awards for his work in Honduras, including the Order of José Cecilio del Valle.

References

Honduran botanists
20th-century Honduran lawyers
Honduran centenarians
Men centenarians
1875 births
1977 deaths
20th-century botanists